Ghadiya is a village in the Indian state of Gujarat. It is part of Kapadvanj Taluka of Kheda district. As of the census of 2011, there were 485 households in the village and its population was 2,254.

References 

Villages in Kheda district